Kerry Norton (born 11 October 1972 in Sunbury-on-Thames, Surrey, England) is a British actress and singer.

Early life
Kerry was born and brought up in her hometown of Sunbury-on-Thames.

Education
Kerry was educated at Sunbury Manor School, a state comprehensive school, and now an academy school, in Sunbury-on-Thames.

Kerry trained at London Contemporary Dance School in London, and at Lee Strasberg Theatre Institute in New York City.

Career
Norton was a gymnast before becoming an actress.

Kerry had a small part on the American TV series, Sabrina the Teenage Witch in 1996. The episode, entitled "A Girl and Her Cat", where she played the part of Lulu, a gymnastic witch, who was engaged to Sabrina's second cousin.

She has made a number of guest appearances on Battlestar Galactica as paramedic Layne Ishay (with her real-life husband as Major Lee 'Apollo' Adama). She appeared in the first three episodes of season 2, "Scattered", "Valley of Darkness" and "Fragged", and a later episode entitled "Downloaded".  She also appeared in the season 3 episode "Taking a Break from All Your Worries", and the season 4 episodes "A Disquiet Follows My Soul", "No Exit", "Islanded in a Stream of Stars" and "Daybreak, Parts 1 and 2".

She also played the leading role of Anne Alstein in The Screwfly Solution. She played the part of Maxi Purvis in Bad Girls' third and fourth series and was a member of the original cast of the touring play Seven Deadly Sins Four Deadly Sinners.

Music career 

In 2005 she recorded an album of covers, titled Young Heart. Track number three ("Everlasting Love") has also been used in a commercial for Grolsch Brewery. In that same year she was invited to record Greensleeves  as a duet with famous Dutch singer Rene Froger for his Christmas album Pure Christmas (released on EMI Music).

Personal life 

Norton is married to fellow actor Jamie Bamber, and they have three daughters: Isla Elizabeth Angela Griffith, and twins Darcy Beatrice and Ava Molly. She has two sisters, Jackie and Lorraine, and a brother, Matthew.

Filmography

References

External links 
 

1973 births
Living people
British television actresses
People from Sunbury-on-Thames
21st-century English women singers
21st-century English singers